The Princess of the Nile (German: Die Prinzessin vom Nil) is a 1920 German silent comedy film directed by Martin Zickel and starring Lya Mara, Julius Falkenstein and Lotte Stein.

The film's sets were designed by the art director Artur Günther.

Cast
In alphabetical order
 Franz Cornelius as Zeddelmann 
 Johanna Ewald as Eulalia 
 Julius Falkenstein as Faktotum 
 Piggy Germont as Asta 
 Paul Graetz as Thobin 
 Siegwart Gruder as König Rhamses 
 Hugo Hummel as Schutzmann 
 Lya Mara as Naomi 
 Heinrich Peer as Graf Gamaleja 
 Karl Platen as Dr. Thesaurus 
 Josef Reithofer as Sklave 
 Eugen Rex as Assessor Erich 
 Gerhard Ritterband as Emil 
 Lotte Stein as Minna 
 Ellen Ullri as Göttin

References

Bibliography
 Bock, Hans-Michael & Bergfelder, Tim. The Concise CineGraph. Encyclopedia of German Cinema. Berghahn Books, 2009.

External links

1920 films
Films of the Weimar Republic
Films directed by Martin Zickel
German silent feature films
German black-and-white films
Silent comedy films
German comedy films